Goodenia lobata is a species of flowering plant in the family Goodeniaceae and is endemic to the South Australia. It is an ascending to low-lying perennial herb with linear to lance-shaped at the base of the plant and racemes of yellow flowers.

Description
Flowering occurs from July to 

Taxonomy
Goodenia lobata was first formally described by botanist Ernest Horace Ising in 1958 in the Transactions of the Royal Society of South Australia. The type specimen was collected by Ising south-west of Oodnadatta. The specific epithet (lobata) means "lobed".

Distribution and habitat
This goodenia grows in scrub or on mounds of rubble and is found in the Lake Eyre basin of South Australia.

References

lobata
Flora of South Australia
Asterales of Australia
Plants described in 1958